James Conway Brown (1838 – 1908) was a Welsh musician. His father was also called James Brown, and was one of the proprietors of the Blaina iron-works, Monmouthshire for a time.

James attended Camberwell Collegiate School and King's College London, before joining his uncle, Thomas Brown, managing director of Ebbw Vale iron-works at Ebbw Vale to train as an Iron-master. He was more interested in music however, and performed as a pianist, violinist, and also as an organist in a number of places of worship.

After deciding to leave his business career for a career in music, he was appointed, in 1869, organist of Aldershot parish church. In 1875 he took up a position as organist of Hale church, near Farnham, and in 1879, of the parish church of Farnham.

His published works include a sonata in E major for violin and pianoforte; this work was awarded the Sir Michael Costa prize by the Trinity College of Music, London. He died in April 1908.

References 

1838 births
1908 deaths
Welsh classical organists
Welsh classical composers
Welsh male classical composers
19th-century British composers
Alumni of King's College London
19th-century British male musicians
19th-century organists